Tonglu East railway station is a railway station in Tonglu County, Hangzhou, Zhejiang, China. It is an intermediate stop on the Shangqiu–Hangzhou high-speed railway (Huzhou–Hangzhou section) and will be the northern terminus of the under construction Hangzhou–Wenzhou high-speed railway.

History 
The structure was topped off in December 2021. It was opened on 22 September 2022.

See also 
 Tonglu railway station

References 

Railway stations in Zhejiang
Railway stations in China opened in 2022